Alexander Lyon may refer to:

Alex Lyon (politician) (1931–1993), British politician
Alex Lyon (ice hockey) (born 1992), American ice hockey goaltender
Alexander Lyon, 2nd Lord Glamis (c. 1430–1486), Scottish nobleman
Alexander Lyons (c. 1868–1939), American-born rabbi